Peter Göbel (born 27 March 1941 in Berlin) is a German former pair skater who represented East Germany and the United Team of Germany in competition.  With partner Margit Senf, he won the gold medal at the East German Figure Skating Championships in 1960, 1961, and 1963.  In 1961, the pair won the bronze medal at the European Figure Skating Championships, and they also competed at the 1964 Winter Olympics, finishing 14th. He later partnered with Marianne Mirmsecker.

Results

With Senf

With Mirmsecker

References
 

1941 births
Living people
Figure skaters from Berlin
German male pair skaters
Figure skaters at the 1964 Winter Olympics
Olympic figure skaters of the United Team of Germany
European Figure Skating Championships medalists